The 2022 Challenger di Roseto degli Abruzzi was a professional tennis tournament played on clay courts. It was the 1st edition of the tournament which was part of the 2022 ATP Challenger Tour. It took place in Roseto degli Abruzzi, Italy between 7 and 13 March 2022.

Singles main-draw entrants

Seeds

 1 Rankings are as of 28 February 2022.

Other entrants
The following players received wildcards into the singles main draw:
  Andrea Del Federico
  Francesco Maestrelli
  Francesco Passaro

The following players received entry into the singles main draw as alternates:
  Duje Ajduković
  Andrea Arnaboldi
  Lukáš Rosol

The following players received entry from the qualifying draw:
  Matteo Arnaldi
  Luciano Darderi
  Alexis Gautier
  Carlos Gimeno Valero
  Calvin Hemery
  Nikolás Sánchez Izquierdo

The following player received entry as a lucky loser:
  Elmar Ejupovic

Champions

Singles

  Carlos Taberner def.  Nuno Borges 6–2, 6–3.

Doubles

  Hugo Nys /  Jan Zieliński def.  Roman Jebavý /  Philipp Oswald 7–6(7–2), 4–6, [10–3].

References

2022 ATP Challenger Tour
March 2022 sports events in Italy
2022 in Italian sport